Elvis Scoria (born 5 July 1971) is a Croatian former football player and manager. He played for HNK Rijeka, Dinamo Zagreb (then called Croatia Zagreb), NK Istra, NK Zagreb and for Spanish club UE Lleida.

Playing career
As a player Scoria appeared in two Cup finals in 1994 with HNK Rijeka and in 1997 with NK Zagreb losing both the finals.

Managerial career
Scoria has also appeared in three Cup finals as a manager in 2003 with NK Uljanik, 2005 with HNK Rijeka and in 2007 with NK Slaven Belupo. He also managed Rijeka in the 2005 Croatian Super Cup where they lost 1–0 in extra time from a goal by Niko Kranjčar.

Career statistics

Managerial statistics

Honours
NK Istra 1961
Druga HNL - South: 2003–04
Druga HNL: 2008–09

HNK Rijeka
Croatian Cup: 2005

References

External links
 

Elvis Scoria short biography at Sportnet.hr (1 January 2009) 

1971 births
Living people
Sportspeople from Pula
Footballers from Rijeka
Croatian people of Italian descent
Association football forwards
Yugoslav footballers
Croatian footballers
HNK Rijeka players
GNK Dinamo Zagreb players
NK Istra players
NK Zagreb players
UE Lleida players
Yugoslav First League players
Croatian Football League players
Segunda División players
Croatian expatriate footballers
Expatriate footballers in Spain
Croatian expatriate sportspeople in Spain
Croatian football managers
NK Istra 1961 managers
HNK Rijeka managers
NK Slaven Belupo managers
Kavala F.C. managers
Croatian expatriate football managers
Expatriate football managers in Greece
Croatian expatriate sportspeople in Greece
Croatian expatriate sportspeople in China